The Marshall Tigers were an East Texas League (1936-1940), Cotton States League (1941) and Lone Star League (1948) baseball team based in Marshall, Texas. They were affiliated with the Chicago White Sox in 1937. Multiple major leaguers, including Eddie Lopat, played for the team.

References

Defunct minor league baseball teams
Baseball teams established in 1936
1936 establishments in Texas
1948 disestablishments in Texas
Marshall, Texas
Defunct baseball teams in Texas
Chicago White Sox minor league affiliates
Baseball teams disestablished in 1948
Defunct Cotton States League teams
East Texas League teams